Grigorevo is a rural locality (a village) in Seletskoye Rural Settlement, Suzdalsky District, Vladimir Oblast, Russia. The population was 1 as of 2010. There are 2 streets.

Geography 
Grigorevo is located on the Tumka River, 18 km west of Suzdal (the district's administrative centre) by road. Konstantinovo is the nearest rural locality.

References 

Rural localities in Suzdalsky District